Paul Jones (born May 17, 1992) is an American football quarterback. He played for the Penn State Nittany Lions from 2010 to 2012. He transferred to Robert Morris University and played for the Robert Morris Colonials in 2013.

Early years
Jones grew up in McKees Rocks, PA and attended Sto-Rox School District where he played high school football under Jason Ruscitto.

Recruiting

College career
Jones graduated high school early and enrolled for the spring semester at Penn State in the spring of 2009. During his freshman season in 2010, Jones was a Redshirt and served as the quarterback on Penn State's scout team. While he showed promise and was expected to compete for the quarterback job in 2011, he had academic troubles and was forced to sit out due to ineligibility. He did regain eligibility for the 2012 season. Though he was initially entrenched in a 4-way QB competition with Matt McGloin, Rob Bolden and Shane McGregor, he was moved to tight end and appeared in his first game against Navy, where he caught one pass for seven yards. Jones left the Penn State football team midway through the 2012 season. He transferred from Penn State to Robert Morris University, where he will have two years of eligibility remaining. Jones is projected as the odds on favorite to be the starting quarterback at RMU for the 2013 season. Jones was ruled academically ineligible for the 2014 season.

Personal
Jones is the son of Paul Sr. and Jenifer Jones. He has 4 younger brothers: Malcolm, Jeremiah, Daniel, and Kristifer. He also has a sister, Jena.

References

1992 births
Living people
American football quarterbacks
Penn State Nittany Lions football players
People from McKees Rocks, Pennsylvania
Players of American football from Pittsburgh
Robert Morris Colonials football players